Sacred Heart Forane Church is a Syro-Malabar Roman Catholic church situated in  Thiruvambady, Kozhikode District, Kerala, India. It is under Syro-Malabar Catholic Diocese of Thamarassery and Archdiocese of Thalassery. The church was established in the year 1944. There are more than 1000 families in this forane and about 5000 members, which is one of the largest church in Diocese. It is also one of the 11 forane in the Diocese of Thamarassery, constituting 14 parishes. The forane now have 14 wards and 60 units. The feast of the church is celebrated on the first Saturday of February every year. The church is abbreviated as 'SH Church Thiruvambady'. Organisations such as Vincent de Paul society, AKCC, KCYM, Mission League, Jesus Youth, are also well active in the church.

Parishes under Thiruvambady Forane

 Anackampoil St. Mary's Syro-Malabar Catholic Church (1967)
 Kallurutty St. Thomas Syro-Malabar Catholic Church (1976)
 Karimbu St. Thomas Syro-Malabar Catholic Church (1999)
 Koodaranji St. Sebastian Syro-Malabar Catholic Church (1949)
 Kuliramutty Mar Sleeva Syro-Malabar Catholic Church (1978)
 Manjakadavu St.Mary's Syro-Malabar Catholic Church (1966)
 Mukkam Sacred Heart Syro-Malabar Catholic Church (1983)
 Muthappanpuzha St.Sebastian's Syro-Malabar Catholic Church (1982)
 Poovaramthode St.Mary's Syro-Malabar Catholic Church (1976)
 Pulloorampara St.Joseph's Syro-Malabar Catholic Church (1952)
 Thekkumkutty Fathima Matha Syro-Malabar Catholic Church (1962)
 Thiruvampady Sacred Heart Syro-Malabar Catholic Church (1944)
 Venappara Holy Family Syro-Malabar Catholic Church (1953) 
 Vilakamthode St.Sebastian's Syro-Malabar Catholic Church (1968)

Other than this 14 parishes Forane comprises 3 stations at Kodakkattupara, Santhi Nagar and Parathode also.

References

Churches in Kozhikode district
Syro-Malabar Catholic church buildings
Eastern Catholic churches in Kerala
Roman Catholic churches completed in 1944
20th-century Roman Catholic church buildings in India